Trends in Food Science and Technology is a monthly peer-reviewed review journal covering food science and technology. It is an official publication of the European Federation of Food Science and Technology and of the International Union of Food Science and Technology. The editors-in-chief are Rickey Yada and Fidel Todra (Institute of Food Research).

Abstracting an indexing
The journal is abstracted and indexed in:

According to the Journal Citation Reports, the journal has a 2021 impact factor of 12.563.

References

External links

Elsevier academic journals
English-language journals
Food science journals
Monthly journals
Publications established in 1990